Magalia Community Church is a historic church located on Stirling Highway in Magalia, California.
Construction of the church began in 1850 but was left incomplete.  This first phase of construction resulted in only the floor and 4 walls.  Completion of the church was not accomplished until 1904.  It was added to the National Register of Historic Places in 1982.

History
It is estimated that around the year 1850, a Christian minister by the name of Albert Samuel Parsons came from Cherokee, California (Butte County, California) and started building a church.  It is uncertain why he eventually abandoned the project, but he left the structure incomplete, only leaving a structure with a foundation, a floor and four walls (including the windows that exist to this day).

In 1900, the Reverend Albert Parsons moved away from the Magalia area and local interest in the church waned. At this point, the property's owner, Mr. George McLean, asked that the partially completed church be removed from the grounds.  Fortuitously, Miss Carrie Brydon, purportedly a staunch supporter of the temperance movement, arrived in Magalia, California from Canada at this time.  She came across the partially completed church and was granted permission to have it moved to a location near the intersection of Old Skyway Road and Glover Lane' (Magalia, California).

With the philanthropic assistance of Annie Bidwell (also see Bidwell Mansion) and the local Crew family, she was able to raise $600.00 to have the church dismantled and then rebuilt to the same specifications.  With the money raised, they were also able to finish the interior and add a vestibule, a belfry, a steeple and a small kitchen.  Sometime later the kitchen area was made part of the church proper to make room for a pulpit, an organ and a piano. It is noted that the bell and organ were purchased by Annie Bidwell at that time for $50.00. The completed building was finally dedicated on Easter Sunday, 1904.

During its history, it appears that the structure was moved three different times but there are varying accounts of the exact locations.  Sources indicate that it might at one time have been located close to Whiskey Flat (Paradise East), California(a.k.a. Whiskey Flats), at another location near the juncture of Coutolenc Road and Old Skyway Road, and perhaps also at yet another location in Magalia between Nimshew Road and the Magalia Reservoir.

Church members report that on a rainy day in 1993, the small church made a final precarious journey to its present-day location on Stirling Highway in Magalia, California.  The Magalia Community Church was dedicated as a historical site on Aug 21, 1982, and the Magalia community continues to support the ongoing cost of restoring and preserving the chapel.  To this day, the original church bell rings out every Sunday morning to signal the start of church services.

Gallery

References

Churches in California
Churches on the National Register of Historic Places in California
Churches completed in 1904
Churches in Butte County, California
National Register of Historic Places in Butte County, California